Brabova is a commune in Dolj County, Oltenia, Romania with a population of 1,776  people. It is composed of six villages: Brabova, Caraiman, Mosna, Răchita de Jos, Urdinița and Voita.

References

Communes in Dolj County
Localities in Oltenia